Scale-a-Ton (pronounced Skeleton) is the second solo studio album by American rapper and record producer DJ Paul. It was released on May 5, 2009 via Scale-A-Ton Entertainment/Hypnotize Minds. Recording sessions took place at Scale-A-Ton Studios in Memphis and Los Angeles. Production was handled entirely by DJ Paul, who also served as executive producer. It features guest appearances from Lord Infamous. The album debuted at number 157 on the Billboard 200 chart, selling 4,000 copies in its first week of sales.

Background
On his official YouTube channel, (which was later reported on AllHipHop), Paul stated that his brother, original Three 6 Mafia member Lord Infamous, will be contributing to the upcoming album.

He helped build Three 6 Mafia, and create Three 6 Mafia… Lord was just going through some things, and he had to get that together. We got it together now. We’re going to be back in the lab working.

With partner Juicy J, DJ Paul played an important role in the South's rise within the rap industry. Three 6 Mafia has sold over 7 million records, plus another 5 million from their affiliated artists, and even won an Academy Award. This CD will be Paul's second official solo album, and features the singles "Jus Like Dat??" and "You Don't Want It", which are already receiving internet buzz.

Information
Lord Infamous appears on eight tracks, and is the sole guest artist on the album.  Most of the album consists of topics that fans are used to hearing Three 6 Mafia talking about already, such as shootouts, drugs, and the streets. One song, "Wanta Be Like You", however, is about how DJ Paul was inspired to get into music, stating that the accomplishments of singer Michael Jackson was his main influence.

Track listing

Personnel
Paul Duane "DJ Paul" Beauregard – vocals, producer, mixing, executive producer, management
Ricky T. "Lord Infamous" Dunigan – vocals (tracks: 2, 7, 10, 12, 13, 15, 18, 19)
Michael "Crazy Mike" Foster – recording, mixing
Kevin Nix – mastering

Chart history

References

2009 albums
DJ Paul albums
Albums produced by DJ Paul